Dexiini is a tribe of flies in the family Tachinidae.

Genera
Aglummyia Townsend, 1912
Amphitropesa Townsend, 1933
Ateloglossa Coquillett, 1899
Bathydexia Wulp, 1891
Billaea Robineau-Desvoidy, 1830
Callotroxis Aldrich, 1929
Camarona Wulp, 1891
Cantrellius Barraclough, 1992
Carbonilla Mesnil, 1974
Chaetocalirrhoe Townsend, 1935
Chaetodexia Mesnil, 1976
Chaetogyne Brauer & von Bergenstamm, 1889
Chaetotheresia Townsend, 1931
Charapozelia Townsend, 1927
Cordillerodexia Townsend, 1927
Daetaleus Aldrich, 1928
Dasyuromyia Bigot, 1885
Dexia Meigen, 1826
Diaugia Perty, 1833
Dinera Robineau-Desvoidy, 1830
Dolichocodia Townsend, 1908
Dolichodinera Townsend, 1935
Echinodexia Brauer & von Bergenstamm, 1893
Effusimentum Barraclough, 1992
Estheria Robineau-Desvoidy, 1830
Euchaetogyne Townsend, 1908
Eudexia Brauer & von Bergenstamm, 1889
Eumegaparia Townsend, 1908
Eupododexia Villeneuve, 1915
Exodexia Townsend, 1927
Frontodexia Mesnil, 1976
Gemursa Barraclough, 1992
Geraldia Malloch, 1930
Gigamyiopsis Reinhard, 1964
Heterometopia Macquart, 1846
Huascarodexia Townsend, 1919
Hyadesimyia Bigot, 1888
Hyosoma Aldrich, 1934
Hystrichodexia Röder, 1886
Hystrisyphona Bigot, 1859
Jurinodexia Townsend, 1915
Leptodexia Townsend, 1919
Macrometopa Brauer & von Bergenstamm, 1889
Mastigiomyia Reinhard, 1964
Megaparia Wulp, 1891
Megapariopsis Townsend, 1915
Mesnilotrix Cerretti & O’Hara, 2016
Microchaetina Wulp, 1891
Microchaetogyne Townsend, 1931
Milada Richter, 1973
Mitannia Herting, 1987
Mochlosoma Brauer & von Bergenstamm, 1889
Morphodexia Townsend, 1931
Myiodexia Cortés & Campos, 1971
Myiomima Brauer & von Bergenstamm, 1889
Myioscotiptera Giglio-Tos, 1893
Neomyostoma Townsend, 1935
Neozelia Guimarães, 1975
Nicephorus Reinhard, 1944
Nimioglossa Reinhard, 1945
Notodytes Aldrich, 1934
Oberonomyia Reinhard, 1964
Ochrocera Townsend, 1916
Ocyrtosoma Townsend, 1912
Ophirodexia Townsend, 1911
Opsotheresia Townsend, 1919
Orestilla Reinhard, 1944
Orthosimyia Reinhard, 1944
Pachymyia Macquart, 1844
Patulifrons Barraclough, 1992
Paulipalpus Barraclough, 1992
Pelycops Aldrich, 1934
Phalacrophyto Townsend, 1915
Phasiops Coquillett, 1899
Philippodexia Townsend, 1926
Piligena Van Emden, 1947
Piligenoides Barraclough, 1985
Pirionimyia Townsend, 1931
Platydexia Van Emden, 1954
Platyrrhinodexia Townsend, 1927
Platytainia Macquart, 1851
Pododexia Brauer & von Bergenstamm, 1889
Pretoriamyia Curran, 1927
Promegaparia Townsend, 1931
Prophorostoma Townsend, 1927
Prorhynchops Brauer & von Bergenstamm, 1891
Prosena Lepeletier & Serville, 1828
Prosenina Malloch, 1930
Prosenoides Brauer & von Bergenstamm, 1891
Psecacera Bigot, 1880
Pseudodexilla O’Hara, Shima & Zhang, 2009
Pseudodinera Brauer & von Bergenstamm, 1891
Ptilodexia Brauer & von Bergenstamm, 1889
Punamyocera Townsend, 1919
Rasiliverpa Barraclough, 1992
Rhamphinina Bigot, 1885
Rutilotrixa Townsend, 1933
Sarcocalirrhoe Townsend, 1928
Sarcoprosena Townsend, 1927
Schistostephana Townsend, 1919
Scotiptera Macquart, 1835
Senostoma Macquart, 1847
Setolestes Aldrich, 1934
Sitellitergus Reinhard, 1964
Sturmiodexia Townsend, 1919
Sumichrastia Townsend, 1916
Taperamyia Townsend, 1935
Tesseracephalus Reinhard, 1955
Trichodura Macquart, 1844
Trichostylum Macquart, 1851
Trixa Meigen, 1824
Trixiceps Villeneuve, 1936
Trixodes Coquillett, 1902
Tromodesiopsis Townsend, 1927
Tropidodexia Townsend, 1915
Tropidopsiomorpha Townsend, 1927
Tylodexia Townsend, 1926
Tyreomma Brauer & von Bergenstamm, 1891
Urodexiomima Townsend, 1927
Ursophyto Aldrich, 1926
Ushpayacua Townsend, 1928
Villanovia Strobl, 1910
Xanthotheresia Townsend, 1931
Yahuarmayoia Townsend, 1927
Zelia Robineau-Desvoidy, 1830
Zeliomima Mesnil, 1976
Zeuxia Meigen, 1826
Zeuxiotrix Mesnil, 1976

References

Brachycera tribes
Dexiinae